The 19th Arizona State Legislature, consisting of the Arizona State Senate and the Arizona House of Representatives, was constituted in Phoenix from January 1, 1949, to December 31, 1950, during the first year of Dan Edward Garvey's first full term as Governor of Arizona. The number of senators and house members remained constant at 19 and 58, respectively. The Democrats controlled one hundred percent of the senate, while the Republicans gained two house seats, to a total of seven.

Sessions
The Legislature met for the regular session at the State Capitol in Phoenix on January 10, 1949; and adjourned on March 19. There were two special sessions: the first convened on February 20, 1950, and adjourned sine die on March 19, 1950; while the second convened on April 10, 1950, and adjourned sine die on April 15, 1950.

State Senate

Members

The asterisk (*) denotes members of the previous Legislature who continued in office as members of this Legislature.

House of Representatives

Members 
The asterisk (*) denotes members of the previous Legislature who continued in office as members of this Legislature.

References

Arizona legislative sessions
1949 in Arizona
1950 in Arizona
1949 U.S. legislative sessions
1950 U.S. legislative sessions